Zamia pygmaea is a species of plant in the family Zamiaceae found only in Cuba. It is the smallest living cycad. It is listed as critically endangered on the IUCN Red List based on its limited distribution, severely fragmented habitat, and population of less than 250 mature individuals.

Common names
The former name was first recorded by Bartolomé de Las Casas around 1550, who described it as the name used by the Native Americans (Taíno) living in the mountains of Cuba, the other names are thought to be bastardisations of the first name when it was adopted into Spanish. The Taíno name for this plant is thought to be a possible origin for the Spanish verb , 'to grate', due to the past use of Zamia species for making bread.

The species has been given the name red dwarf cycad by one US website.

Description
The smallest cycad plant, some individuals have been found which have only grown to a height of only . It forms a short underground trunk which holds a small crown of short, stiff, slightly arching leaves with rounded leaflets.

The stem bears small sheathing cataphylls with a pair of inconspicuous stipules. In its harsh native habitat the compound leaves are one to four in number, but in cultivation plants may grow with up to twenty leaves —these have smooth petioles and rachis, and bear five to fifteen pairs of ovate leaflets, although in cultivation the plant grows more pairs of leaflets. They bear dark reddish brown, pedunculate pollen cones and dark reddish brown to gray seed cones. The seeds are ovoid and red to orange-red in colour.

Zamia pygmaea is one of the species of Zamia that can change drastically under cultivation. The plants become more vigorous and produce more and larger leaves and larger stems.

Habitat and distribution
Zamia pygmaea is endemic to the tropical islands of Cuba. It is limited to western Cuba and Isla de la Juventud. It generally grows in open, dry habitats varying from serpentine to limestone outcrops to almost pure sand.

Along with Z. angustifolia, Z. pygmaea is one of the most xerophytic species in the genus. It occurs in dry brush covered hills, pine covered tropical grassland, tropical dry forest and tropical coastal areas of white sand.

Conservation
The primary threats to Z. pygmaea are from species mortality, brought on by direct harvest from the wild, farming and ranching as a result of agricultural expansion, and intensification and deforestation resulting in habitat loss or fragmentation. There are estimated to be fewer than 250 mature plants in western Cuba. It is protected in the San Ubaldo-Sabanalamar Ecological Reserve in the Pinar del Río province, and also in the Los Indios Ecological Reserve on the Isla de la Juventud island.

References

Flora of Cuba
pygmaea
Data deficient plants
Endemic flora of Cuba
Taxonomy articles created by Polbot